Pristimantis martiae is a species of frog in the family Strabomantidae.
It is found in Brazil, Colombia, Ecuador, Peru, and possibly Bolivia.
Its natural habitats are tropical moist lowland forests and moist montane forests.

References

martiae
Amphibians of Brazil
Amphibians of Colombia
Amphibians of Ecuador
Amphibians of Peru
Amphibians described in 1974
Taxonomy articles created by Polbot